K45AR channel 45 was a low-power UHF television station located in Eagle Bend, Minnesota. It started in the late 1970s under the call sign KXG2CB, then transmitting on a 100-watt transmitter under an experimental license from the FCC. K45AR was used for the first educational instructional television (ITV) system in the state. The station was run by the schools of Bertha-Hewitt, Clarissa, and Eagle Bend.

History 
K45AR was the idea of Eagle Bend High School principal Richard Lundgren. Lundgren was in search of getting a way to provide more educational opportunities to his students for a low cost. Instructional television allowed schools to sharing teachers without the teachers or students leaving their respective schools.

When K45AR first went on the air it operated under the experimental license KG2XCB. Its first transmitter was located in Eagle Bend. Its power was 100 watts and its tower was about 190 ft. Along with Eagle Bend Public School, the Bertha-Hewitt and Clarissa public schools each owned an ITFS microwave transmitter to broadcast via closed circuit between schools. Each school was located approximately 5 miles apart from each other. With this system the schools could teach classes from each site and the students could interact with the teachers at each site. Because KG2XCB broadcast on a conventional UHF channel in the clear, people with a regular antenna could receive the signal at home and watch the classes being offered by the schools. The station also broadcast adult and children's educational programs when the three schools were not broadcasting, including PBS programs furnished by WDSE in Duluth.

In January 1980 the system was dedicated, attended by people from all over Minnesota and the United States.

In October 1984 the FCC granted a license to upgrade KG2XCB to become K45AR, a regular low-power UHF TV station. It now had a new,  and a new transmitter capable of 1,000 watts. Because of its new height and power the three schools added 2 more schools to its ITV system: Parkers Prairie and Staples Public Schools.

Because of growing cost issues to the station's upkeep, the station was taken off the air and sold in 1998.

References

External links
FCC Record of DK45AR
FCC Record of DKG2XCB
City-data.com: Eagle Bend MN
NTIA: Fiscal Year 1995 (1984 Reference to upgrade KG2XCB To K45AR)

Television channels and stations established in 1980
Television channels and stations disestablished in 1998
Defunct television stations in the United States
1980 establishments in Minnesota
1998 disestablishments in Minnesota
Defunct mass media in Minnesota